Alice Schlegel is an anthropologist known for her work on adolescence. She was elected a fellow of the American Association for the Advancement of Science in 1972.

Education and career 
Schlegel attended Smith College from 1952 until 1954, and then graduated with a B.A. from Northwestern University. She went on to earn an M.A. from the University of Chicago (1959) and a Ph.D. from Northwestern University in 1971. Following her Ph.D., she held academic positions at multiple institutions including the University of Baroda, India, Museum of Northern Arizona, University of Tubingen, University of Frankfurt. In 1980 she joined the faculty of the University of Arizona and was promoted to professor in 2005. As of 2021, she is a retired professor of anthropology at the University of Arizona.

Research 
Schlegel's research touched on multiple areas including adolescence, the human need for physical contact, and the segregation of people by age and gender.

Selected publications

Awards and honors 
Schlegel was elected fellow of the American Association for the Advancement of Science in 1972.

References 

Northwestern University alumni
University of Chicago alumni
University of Arizona faculty
Fellows of the American Association for the Advancement of Science
Living people
Women anthropologists
Year of birth missing (living people)